Upin & Ipin Jeng Jeng Jeng! is a 2016 Malaysian live-action animated film. The film is produced by Les' Copaque Production in partnership with KRU Studios and released in Malaysian cinemas beginning 24 November 2016.

Plot 
Based on the hugely popular Upin & Ipin TV series, it sees the five-year-old twins interact with human actors, and tells the story of their diehard fan, a young orphan named Aqish, who imagines them being real. Aqish discovers that the owner of the land on which her orphanage is built has returned to claim it back, and she enlists the help of Upin and Ipin to save the day.

Cast 
 Asyiela Putri Azhar (voice) as Upin & Ipin
 Puteri Balqis Azizi as Aqish
 Awie as Awie (himself)
 Sara Ali as Noreen
 Remy Ishak as Bo
 Gambit Saifullah as Zaman
 David Teo as Lavid

Production 
Les’ Copaque managing director, Burhanuddin Md Radzi said that the idea to produce live-action film based on this popular animation came across since 2013. The film was shot and completed in the same year but was not released due to many technical issues. Returning from a much loss of that film production, the studio continued to make progress and a new film was shot in October 2014. Taking one month to complete, he satisfied with the result and hoped it will be well received by the audience.

Reception

References 

2016 films
Malaysian animated films
Les' Copaque Production films
KRU Studios films
Films shot in Malaysia